Oumar Diop (born 12 November 1992) is a Guinean professional footballer who plays as a right back for Swiss club Signal FC Bernex-Confignon. In 2015, he made five appearances for the Guinea national team.

Career
Born in Conakry, Diop has played for Raja Casablanca, Chabab Rif Al Hoceima, KAC Kénitra, Città di Scordia and Sedan.

He made his international debut for Guinea in 2015.

References

1992 births
Living people
Guinean footballers
Guinea international footballers
Raja CA players
Chabab Rif Al Hoceima players
KAC Kénitra players
CS Sedan Ardennes players
Botola players
Championnat National players
Association football fullbacks
Guinean expatriate footballers
Guinean expatriate sportspeople in Morocco
Expatriate footballers in Morocco
Guinean expatriate sportspeople in Italy
Expatriate footballers in Italy
Guinean expatriate sportspeople in France
Expatriate footballers in France
Guinean expatriate sportspeople in Switzerland
Expatriate footballers in Switzerland